Kirti Nidhi Bista (15 January 1927 – 11 November 2017) was a Nepali politician and 25th Prime Minister of Nepal.

Biography
Bista was born in Thamel, Kathmandu, Nepal in 1927. He served as prime minister of Nepal from 1969 to 1970, 1971 to 1973 and 1977 to 1979. He was minister of finance from 1969 to 1970 and from 1971 to 1973 AD. 

After the coup d'état of King Gyanendra in 2005 AD, Bista was appointed one of the vice-chairmen until the government collapsed in April 2006 after the people's uprising. He is best remembered for resigning from the prime ministerial post after Singha Durbar burned down in 1973.

Bista died at his residence in Gyaneshwor on 11 November 2017. He was 90 years old at that time. Bista had been battling a long-term cancer.

References

1927 births
2017 deaths
Prime ministers of Nepal
Finance ministers of Nepal
People from Kathmandu
Nepalese Hindus
Deaths from cancer in Nepal
20th-century prime ministers of Nepal